The 2003 Mario Andretti Grand Prix at Road America was the twelfth round of the 2003 CART World Series season, held on August 3, 2003 at the Road America circuit in Elkhart Lake, Wisconsin.

The race was shortened to 34 laps from the scheduled 60 after the race was red-flagged twice because of rain.  The first stoppage lasted 20 minutes after only 1 lap and the second lasted 2 hours and 40 minutes after lap 7.  With darkness impending at the restart after the second red flag period, the race had to be shortened from its original length.

Race cancellation and rescheduling
This race was canceled in March 2003 (along with the planned race for 2004) after a legal dispute developed between the Road America's owner George Bruggenthies and CART.  However, Mario Andretti was able to negotiate an agreement between the parties and the race was restored to CART's schedule in April.  The race was then named in Andretti's honor.

Qualifying results

Race

Caution flags

Notes 

 Average Speed 86.493 mph

External links
 Full Weekend Times & Results

References

Road America
Mario Grand Prix At Road America
Champ Car Grand Prix of Road America